Petr Čársky (born on May 29, 1942) is a Slovakian quantum chemist.
 
He obtained in 1968 his Ph.D. at Czechoslovak Academy of Sciences, Prague.
 
He worked as senior researcher at the Institute of Organic Chemistry and Biochemistry, Czechoslovak Academy of Sciences, Prague (1989-1990).  He became in 1990 Theoretical group leader, Jaroslav Heyrovsky Institute of Physical Chemistry, Academy of Sciences of the Czech Republic, Prague.

Research 

Development of  quantum-chemical methods in general.  And in particular:
 Multireference coupled cluster 
 Electron-molecule scattering theory and its applications to high resolution electron energy loss spectroscopy 
 Ab initio calculations on molecules with unusual bonding.

Awards and honors 

 Fellow of the Czech Learned Society (1994).
 International Academy of Quantum Molecular Science (1994)

References

Members of the International Academy of Quantum Molecular Science
Czech chemists
1942 births
Living people
Institute of Organic Chemistry and Biochemistry of the CAS